Lindesnes Lighthouse is a coastal lighthouse at the southernmost tip of Norway, about  southwest of the village of Høllen in Lindesnes municipality in Agder county. The present lighthouse was built in 1915, although the station was first built in 1656 to mark the entrance to the Skaggerak and the Baltic Sea from the North Sea. The lighthouse is painted white, with a red top.

History
The lighthouse was first built in 1656, and over the centuries, several more were built to replace the older ones. In 1822, the lighthouse was refitted with a coal lamp, and in 1854, a new lamp was installed with the current lens. The current cast iron tower was set up in 1915 and fitted with the old Fresnel lens. In 1920, the lighthouse station got its first fog signal, a siren. The fog signal and its machinery is placed in a building beside the tower.

During World War II, the lighthouse was taken over by the Germans. Being an important watchpoint, the Germans built a small fortress with four guns and, after a while, a radar antenna. The traces from World War II are still visible as trenches, tunnels, and other fortifications.

In the 1950s, the lighthouse station was electrified and the fog signal was replaced with a powerful Diaphone. The fog signal was closed as a navigational aid in 1988, but it is still operational and is used on special occasions.

The lighthouse was selected as the millennium site for Vest-Agder county.

Museum
Lindesnes Lighthouse is owned by the Norwegian Coastal Administration and is still active. It is also a museum, operated by the non-profit Lindesnes Lighthouse Museum Foundation. In addition to the buildings belonging to the lighthouse, keeper's cottages, sheds, and boathouses, Lindesnes Lighthouse also has a visitor centre inside the nearby mountain with exhibitions, a cinema hall and a cafeteria. There is also a museum shop.

Lindesnes Lighthouse Museum is a part of the National Museums of Coastal Infrastructure, Kystmusea, together with Tungenes Lighthouse outside Stavanger, Dalsfjord Lighthouse museum in Sunnmøre, and the Lofoten Museum in Kabelvåg. Kystmusea cooperates closely with the Norwegian Coastal Administration.

See also

 List of lighthouses in Norway
 Lighthouses in Norway
 Extreme points of Norway

References

External links

 Norsk Fyrhistorisk Forening: Lindesnes Fyrstasjon 
 Lindesnes fyrstasjon museum

Lighthouses completed in 1656
Towers completed in 1656
Lighthouses completed in 1915
Listed lighthouses in Norway
Lighthouses in Agder
Museums in Agder
Maritime museums in Norway
Lighthouse museums
1655 establishments in Norway
Lindesnes
Millennium sites